Virginie Hocq (born 26 February 1975) is a Belgian actress and comedian.

Theatre

Filmography

References

External links

1975 births
Living people
Belgian actresses
People from Nivelles